Ewen Henderson (born 1987)  is a multi-instrumentalist folk musician from Fort William in Scotland.

Musical career
Henderson comes from a musical family, with his sisters Megan (of Breabach) and Ingrid and brother Allan (formerly of Blazin' Fiddles) in particular being musicians of renown.  He started learning the fiddle at the age of five under the tutelage of Aonghas Grant Snr.

Besides fiddle, Ewen regularly performs on bagpipe, penny whistle and piano. He is also fluent in Scottish Gaelic and sings in the language.

He has been a member of Battlefield Band (2010-2014), the Pneumatic Drills and Skipinnish but is currently most often found performing with Mànran, the band he helped found in 2010.  His Scottish Gaelic singing has been aired on BBC Alba broadcasts. Since 2015, Ewen has also performed regularly with World music pioneers the Afro Celt Sound System.

Henderson is in high demand as a composer and created the soundtrack to the 2016 BBC Alba documentary "The Wee Govan Gadgies/ Pìobairean Beaga Bhaile Ghobhainn". At 2017's Celtic Connections festival, Ewen Henderson was Musical Director of "Strì is Buaidh: Strife and Success", a show covering Gaelic political music over the last 600 years.

A keen follower of the sport shinty, he has played for Glasgow University Shinty Club.

Discography

With Mànran 
 2011: Latha Math (Single)
 2011: Mànran
 2013: The Test
 2017: An Dà Là / The Two Days
 2021: Ùrar

With Battlefield Band 
 2011: Line-up
 2013: Room Enough For All

With The Donnchadh Bàn Boys 
 2014: Mìorbhail nam Beann

With Afro Celt Sound System 
 2016: The Source

solo 
 2020: Steall

References

External links
 Ewen Henderson Profile 

1986 births
Living people
Shinty players
Folk fiddlers
Scottish folk musicians
Scottish multi-instrumentalists
21st-century Scottish male singers
Scottish Gaelic singers
People from Fort William, Highland
Battlefield Band members
Mànran members
21st-century violinists